Drusus Julius Caesar may refer to:

 Drusus Julius Caesar, son of Roman emperor Tiberius
 Drusus Caesar, son of Germanicus, nephew of Tiberius, and first cousin of the above